The French Guy is a 2004 Russian comedy film directed by Vera Storozheva.

Plot 
The film tells about the relationship of the French baron Paul de Russo and the modest translator Anna from a quiet provincial town.

Cast 
 Mikhail Efremov as Karpienko
 Ekaterina Filippova
 Mariya Golubkina as Anya
 Thierry Monfray
 Dmitriy Orlov
 Sergei Popov as Anya's Father
 Irina Rakhmanova as Passenger
 Nina Ruslanova as Anya's Mother
 Garik Sukachyov
 Zoya Tolbuzina
 Natalya Smirnova

References

External links 
 

2004 films
2000s Russian-language films
Russian comedy films
2004 comedy films